Vivek Harshan (born 28 May 1981) is a National Film Awards winning Indian film editor who works predominantly in Malayalam and Tamil films. He has frequently collaborated with Amal Neerad since the beginning of his career. Big B, Iyobinte Pusthakam, Varathan, Bheeshma Parvam are some of his notable works.

Film career 
Vivek Harshan started working as an independent editor with the Malayalam film Red Salute (2006). He got break in his second film Big B (2007). His work on the 2014 Tamil film Jigarthanda got him the National Award for that year.

Filmography

Film Editor

Awards

National Film Awards
 2014 – National Film Award for Best Editing for Jigarthanda

Vijay Awards
 2014 – Vijay Award for Best Editor for Jigarthanda

References

External links 
 
 https://www.imdb.com/name/nm2574962/

Living people
Malayalam film editors
Tamil film editors
Best Editor National Film Award winners
1981 births